Kruszyna  is a village in the administrative district of Gmina Trojanów, within Garwolin County, Masovian Voivodeship, in east-central Poland.

The village has a population of 140.

References

Kruszyna